The coat of arms of the Republic of Kalmykia is a symbol of the Republic of Kalmykia, a federal subject of Russia. It was adopted by the republic's Parliament on June 14, 1996.

The description
The coat of arms represents the image yellow color in a frame of a national ornament on a blue background. Its base depicts petals of a white lotus flower.

See also
Emblem of Mongolia
Flag of the Republic of Kalmykia

References

Notes

Sources

Kalmykia
Kalmykia